The Head of the Family is a 1928 American silent comedy film directed by Joseph Boyle and starring William Russell, Mickey Bennett and Virginia Lee Corbin.

Cast
 William Russell as The Plumber 
 Mickey Bennett as His Assistant 
 Virginia Lee Corbin as Alice Sullivan 
 Richard Walling as Charley Sullivan 
 Alma Bennett as Mabel Manning 
 William Welsh as Daniel Sullivan 
 Aggie Herring as Maggie Sullivan

References

Bibliography
 Munden, Kenneth White. The American Film Institute Catalog of Motion Pictures Produced in the United States, Part 1. University of California Press, 1997.

External links
 

1928 films
1928 comedy films
1920s English-language films
American silent feature films
Silent American comedy films
Films directed by Joseph Boyle
American black-and-white films
Gotham Pictures films
1920s American films